Anthony Gerard Damien D'Adam is an Australian politician. He has been a member of the New South Wales Legislative Council since 2019, representing the Australian Labor Party.

D'Adam was a Labor Party branch secretary in the Auburn electorate, and was a former campaign manager for Luke Foley during his campaign for the New South Wales Legislative Assembly seat of Auburn. He is a member of the NSW Left faction.

Political career

Trade Union Career 
Prior to entering Parliament, D'Adam worked for three trade unions: The Forestry and Furnishing Products Division of the Construction, Forestry, Maritime, Mining and Energy Union, the Public Service Association of NSW, and the Media, Entertainment and Arts Alliance. D'Adam supported a Picket line at New South Wales Parliament House as part of the Public Service Association of NSW's campaign against the Labor Government's changes to the worker compensation scheme. D'Adam cited his experience in the picket-line and other non-violent civil-disobedience campaigns in a speech criticising the Roads and Crimes Legislation Amendment Bill 2022.

Labor Party Involvement 
D'Adam is a member of the NSW Labor Left Faction.

During his career in the Labor Party, D'Adam has supported structural reforms which prioritise rank-and-file democracy over "the centralisation of authority".

Prior to his election in 2019, D'Adam was a long-term member of the NSW Labor Administrative Committee. D'Adam publicly supported the attempts of Prime Minister Kevin Rudd and Senator John Faulkner to reform NSW Labor in 2013 in the wake of the Craig Thompson Affair and Independent Commission Against Corruption investigations concerning NSW Labor figures Eddie Obeid, Joe Tripodi, and Ian Macdonald.

In 2019 D'Adam called on NSW Labor to abolish its General Secretary position following the revelation that the incumbent General Secretary, Kaila Murnain, was aware of  an illegal $100,000 donation to the party from billionaire property-developer Huang Xiangmo.

In 2020, D'Adam expressed concern that the structure of the Labor Party is leading to the collapse of rank-and-file participation and ultimately the Pasokification of the party. Following the resignation of NSW Labor Leader Jodi McKay in May 2021, D'Adam published an opinion piece in the Sydney Morning Herald calling on NSW Labor to conduct a rank-and-file ballot between the presumptive leadership candidates, Michael Daley and Chris Minns.

D'Adam is a founding editor of Unprecedented Times Magazine, a Labor Party publication associated with Democratic socialism and the Australian Campaign for Labor Party Democracy.

Parliamentary career 
As a Member of the NSW Legislative Council, D'Adam has supported progressing social reforms including the legalisation of abortion in 2019 and the proposed legalisation of Voluntary euthanasia in March 2022. D'Adam opposed Mark Latham's Education Legislation Amendment (Parental Rights) Bill 2020. D'Adam echoed the position of LGBTIQ+ rights groups, the NSW Council for Civil Liberties, and the New South Wales Teachers Federation who condemned the proposed legislation as an attack on trans and gender diverse students in NSW Public Schools. In a dissenting statement attached to the final report of a Legislative Council inquiry into the Bill, D'Adam argued that the legislation would "do real and lasting damage to our education system".

D'Adam has been critical of international human rights abuses and the rise of Far-right politics including the normalisation of "anti‑Semitism, Islamophobia, and increasing hostility to the LGBTQI community". In his inaugural speech, D'Adam linked his opposition to the far-right with the fact that his family came to Australia as political refugees following the rise of Benito Mussolini's regime in Italy. In March 2022, D'Adam cited a report by the Islamic Sciences and Research Academy of Australia which related rising instances of Islamophobia with the normalisation of racism in the wake of the Christchurch mosque shootings. In a speech to Parliament, D'Adam  argued that "Fascism has always preyed on the fears and discontents of alienated people to undermine and destabilise democratic institutions and erode social cohesion". D'Adam has spoken outside Parliament at community forums concerning the rise of the far-right and has celebrated the Anti-fascist activities of Arthur Rae.

D'Adam is an advocate for the rights of Palestinian People within the Labor Party and NSW Parliament. During the 2021 Israel–Palestine crisis, D'Adam criticised the Israeli military and spoke in support of the Arab Australian Federation's Statement on Anti-Palestinianism. In a 2021 speech commemorating The Tamil Genocide by Sri Lanka, D'Adam called on the Australian Government to consider implementing Magnitsky legislation to target perpetrators of human rights abuses.

Despite being bound by the rules of NSW Labor to support the caucus position on the Roads and Crimes Legislation Amendment Bill 2022, D'Adam spoke against the legislation along with his Labor colleagues Peter Primrose and Shaoquett Moselmane. D'Adam argued that the penalties enshrined in the legislation for nonviolent protest - including  up to two years in jail and $22,000 fines -  are "not proportionate" to the disruption caused by the Blockade Australia activists it notionally targets. Further, D'Adam argued against  the Bill on the basis that it could be used to imprison people who participate in socially progressive forms of protest. D'Adam observed that the legislation criminalises tactics adopted by participants in the Selma to Montgomery marches and by "suffragettes [who] chained themselves to Parliament House in a form of direct action not dissimilar to the kinds of direct action the bill is trying to criminalise". D'Adam contradicted his Left Factional counterparts Penny Sharpe, Rose Jackson, and John Graham who spoke in favour of the legislation.

References

 

Year of birth missing (living people)
Living people
Labor Left politicians
Members of the New South Wales Legislative Council
Australian Labor Party members of the Parliament of New South Wales
21st-century Australian politicians